The women's triple jump event  at the 2001 IAAF World Indoor Championships was held on March 11.

Results

References
Results

Triple
Triple jump at the World Athletics Indoor Championships
2001 in women's athletics